Khaan Dost is a 1976 Bollywood action film directed by Dulal Guha. The film was remade in Telugu as Mosagadu.

Plot
Naive, simple-minded Ramdin Pandey lives a poor lifestyle in Nasik, India, along with his sister, Shanti, and works as a Havaldar in the Nasik Central Jail. He arranges Shanti's marriage, but the prospective groom's family want Rs.5000/- which he is unable to afford. To make matters worse, due to his simplistic job performance he has not been promoted. Then their jail gets a new inmate, the dreaded Rehmat Khan, who has been found guilty of killing Ranga for allegedly attempting to molest his prostitute mistress, Zareena. Rehmat finds out about Ramdin's weakness, befriends him and then uses him to escape on the pretext of visiting his ailing mother in Bombay, and never returns. A furious Jailor, Sharma, asks Ramdin to travel to Bombay, locate Rehmat, and then return or else he will not only lose his job, but also be prosecuted. A hapless Ramdin agrees to do so - little knowing that soon he will be at the mercy of the cunning and cruel Rehmat as well as Ranga's vengeful brother, Jaggi.

Cast
Raj Kapoor as Constable Ramdin Pandey 
Shatrughan Sinha as Rehmat Khan 
Mithu Mukherjee as Zareena 
Yogeeta Bali as Shanti Pandey
Satyendra Kapoor as Jailor Sharma  
Sulochana Latkar as Mrs. Khan
Asit Sen as Inspector Chaubey 
Jagdish Raj as Mohan 
Maruti as Hitler
Chandulal

Soundtrack

References

External links
 

1976 films
1970s Hindi-language films
1976 action films
Films scored by Kalyanji Anandji
Hindi films remade in other languages
Indian action films